Jan Claesson (born 18 January 1958) is a retired Swedish ice hockey player. Claesson was part of the Djurgården Swedish champions' team of 1983. Claesson made 117 Elitserien appearances for Djurgården.

Career statistics

Regular season and playoffs

International

References

Swedish ice hockey forwards
Djurgårdens IF Hockey players
1958 births
Living people